L'ultima neve di primavera (internationally known as The Last Snows of Spring) is a 1973 Italian drama film written and directed by Raimondo Del Balzo.

The film obtained a great commercial success and launched the career of child actor Renato Cestiè. Furthermore, the film started a genre of melodramatic films known as "tearjerker movie" or "lacrima movie".

Cast 
Bekim Fehmiu: Roberto
 Agostina Belli: Veronica
 Renato Cestiè: Luca
 Nino Segurini: Bernardo
 Margherita Horowitz: Mariolina

References

External links

1973 films
Italian drama films
Films scored by Franco Micalizzi
1973 drama films
1970s Italian films
1970s Italian-language films